The Jacupiranga Mosaic is a protected area mosaic of 14 units, located in the Atlantic Forest biome within the state of São Paulo of southeastern Brazil.

It is centered on the former Jacupiranga State Park.

History

It was the fifth mosaic to be created in Brazil, and was intended to reconcile sustainable economic development with conservation objectives.

The law created five sustainable development reserves and one extractive reserve, totaling  and four environmental protection areas totaling .
The remaining residents in the Caverna do Diabo, Rio Turvo and Lagamar Cananéia state parks were to be relocated to the sustainable use units, so the forest remnants could be protected..

Conservation units

The Jacupiranga Mosaic includes the following conservation units:

See also

Notes

Sources

Protected area mosaics of Brazil
Protected areas of São Paulo (state)
Protected areas of the Atlantic Forest
2008 establishments in Brazil